Vazha Tarkhnishvili (born 25 August 1971 in Gori) is a retired Georgian–Moldovan footballer who played his last 13 years of activity as a defender for the Moldovan National Division club Sheriff Tiraspol. He was also capped twice for Georgia. In 2006 Tarkhnishvili was granted Moldovan citizenship.

Honours
Divizia Naţională: 11
 2000–01, 2001–02, 2002–03, 2003–04, 2004–05, 2005–06, 2006–07, 2007–08, 2008–09, 2009–10, 2011–12

Moldovan Cup: 7
 1998–99, 2000–01, 2001–02, 2005–06, 2007–08, 2008–09, 2009–10

Moldovan Super Cup: 4
 2003, 2004, 2005, 2007

CIS Cup: 2
 2003, 2009

References

External links
 Player profile at Sheriff's official web-site

1971 births
Living people
Association football midfielders
Footballers from Georgia (country)
Georgia (country) international footballers
FC Dila Gori players
FC Lokomotivi Tbilisi players
FC Sheriff Tiraspol players
Erovnuli Liga players
Moldovan Super Liga players
Expatriate footballers in Moldova
Expatriate sportspeople from Georgia (country) in Moldova
Expatriate footballers from Georgia (country)
Moldovan people of Georgian descent
Naturalised citizens of Moldova
FC Sheriff Tiraspol non-playing staff